Moodorama is a German electronic music collective from Regensburg. Formed in 1998, Moodorama's music is influenced by jazz, lounge music, bossa nova and house music. The members of the group include Martin Sennebogen, Kerstin Huber, Bernhard Frank, Marco Köstler and Mario Malzer. As of 2007, Moodorama has its own record label music for collapsing people.

Discography

Albums 
 2012: SIX (Mole Listening Pearls)
 2006: My Name Is Madness (Mole Listening Pearls)
 2005: Mystery in a cup of tea(Audiopharm)
 2003: Listen (Audiopharm)
 2000: Music for Collapsing people (Europe: Stereo Deluxe/United States: Shadow Records)
 1998: Basement Music (Europe: Stereo Deluxe/United States: Shadow Records)

Singles 
 2008: Audiobahn (Mole Listening Pearls)
 2007: Mind Traffic (Mole Listening Pearls)
 2005: Furious Floods (Audiopharm)
 2003: No Samba Me Criei (Audiopharm)
 2003: Eye-Land (Audiopharm)
 2003: Sweet Toffee (Audiopharm)
 2000: Viama (Stereo Deluxe)
 2000: Sinzing Sunset Boulevard (Stereo Deluxe)

References

External links 
 Website
 Artist's website at Mole Listening Pearls

German electronic music groups
Ambient music groups
Lounge musicians
Culture in Regensburg
Musical groups established in 1998